Antti Olavi Holma (born 6 December 1982 in Helsinki) is a Finnish actor, writer and author. As an actor, he gained popularity after appearing in the sixth season of the sketch comedy show Putous in 2014. He released his debut novel Järjestäjä in 2014, followed by a poetry book Kauheimmat runot in 2015. Holma is openly gay and is married to a French harpist Emmanuel Ceysson.

Holma debuted as the host of the quiz show Haluatko miljonääriksi? in August 2022, succeeding Jaajo Linnonmaa.

Selected filmography

Films
Tali-Ihantala 1944 (2007)
Ei kiitos (2014)
Armi elää! (2015)
Kanelia kainaloon, Tatu ja Patu! (2016)
Veljeni vartija (2018)
Television
Tauno Tukevan sota (2010)
Myllyrinne Company (2014)
Putous (2014)
Kingi (2015)
Haluatko miljonääriksi? (2022–present)
Podcasts
Radio Sodoma (2017, 2019)
Auta Antti! (2018–2019)
Antti Holman oopperajuhlat (2020)
Antin Palautepalvelu (2021)

References

External links

1982 births
Finnish-language writers
Finnish male film actors
Finnish emigrants to England
Finnish writers
Living people
Gay novelists
Finnish gay actors
Finnish gay writers
Finnish LGBT novelists
21st-century LGBT people